Ezekiel 46 is the forty-sixth chapter of the Book of Ezekiel in the Hebrew Bible or the Old Testament of the Christian Bible. This book contains the 
prophecies attributed to the prophet/priest Ezekiel, and is one of the Books of the Prophets. The final section of Ezekiel, chapters 40-48, give the ideal picture of a new temple. The Jerusalem Bible refers to this section as "the Torah of Ezekiel". In particular, chapters 44–46 record various laws governing the rites and personnel of the sanctuary, as a supplement to Ezekiel's vision.

This chapter contains Ezekiel's vision of the ordinances for the prince in his worship (Ezekiel 46:1-8) and for the people (verses 9–15), an order for the prince's inheritance (verses 16–18) and the use of the courts for the boiling and baking of offerings (verses 19–24). The vision was given on the 25th anniversary of Ezekiel's exile, "April 28, 573 BCE"; 14 years after the fall of Jerusalem and 12 years after the last messages of hope in chapter 39.

Text
The original text was written in the Hebrew language. This chapter is divided into 24 verses.

Textual witnesses

Some early manuscripts containing the text of this chapter in Hebrew are of the Masoretic Text tradition, which includes the Codex Cairensis (895), the Petersburg Codex of the Prophets (916), Aleppo Codex (10th century), Codex Leningradensis (1008). Fragments containing verses 1–3 of this chapter were identified among the Dead Sea Scrolls.

There is also a translation into Koine Greek known as the Septuagint, made in the last few centuries BC. Extant ancient manuscripts of the Septuagint version include Codex Vaticanus (B; B; 4th century), Codex Alexandrinus (A; A; 5th century) and Codex Marchalianus (Q; Q; 6th century).

Regulations for worship (46:1–15)
This section contains the continuation of the instruction for the prince's part in worship, together with the regulations for the people.

Verse 15
 " Thus they shall prepare the lamb, the grain offering, and the oil, as a regular burnt offering every morning."
The prince is obliged to make daily offerings.

Land laws for the prince (46:16–18)

The temple kitchens (46:19–24)

Verse 20
And he said to me, "This is the place where the priests shall boil the trespass offering and the sin offering, and where they shall bake the grain offering, so that they do not bring them out into the outer court to sanctify the people."

Verse 24
 And he said to me, "These are the kitchens where the ministers of the temple shall boil the sacrifices of the people."

The kitchens described in verse 24 belong to the Levites and are different from those for the priests described in verses 19–20. This is to assure that the holy things will be properly separated and not to be 'contaminated by contact with the profane'.

See also

Levi
New Jerusalem Dead Sea Scroll
New Moon
Sabbath
Third Temple
Related Bible parts: Ezekiel 40, Ezekiel 43, Ezekiel 44, Ezekiel 45, Ezekiel 47, Ezekiel 48, Revelation 21, Revelation 22

Notes

References

Sources

External links

Jewish
Ezekiel 46 Hebrew with Parallel English
Ezekiel 46 Hebrew with Rashi's Commentary

Christian
Ezekiel 46 English Translation with Parallel Latin Vulgate

46